The Kensington Studios (also known as the Viking Studios) were film production studios located in Kensington, London that operated between 1947 and 1950. 

The film I'm a Stranger released in 1952 was made there.

During the 1950s, it was used for some advertising films, but gradually television work came to dominate the studio's output.

References

Bibliography
 Warren, Patricia. British Film Studios: An Illustrated History. Batsford, 2001.

British film studios